"Together Forever" is a song recorded by English singer-songwriter Rick Astley and released as the fourth single from his debut album, Whenever You Need Somebody (1987). It reached number two in the United Kingdom, behind Neighbours star and fellow Stock Aitken Waterman artist Kylie Minogue's debut single "I Should Be So Lucky". The song reached number one on the Billboard Hot 100 on 18 June 1988, becoming Astley's second and final US chart-topper, and also topped the charts in Canada, Ireland and Spain. It also peaked at number five in Germany and Italy and within the top 10 in Austria and Iceland.

The song uses a similar chord structure and melody to Astley's debut single "Never Gonna Give You Up" (like most songs written and produced by Stock/Aitken/Waterman at the time), and has occasionally been used as an alternate Rickroll song.

In 2019, Astley recorded and released a 'Reimagined' version of the song for his album The Best of Me, which features a new piano arrangement.

In a YouTube community post saying "Soon all will become clear..." and celebrating the announcement of the Whenever You Need Somebody remastered edition studio album, the music video has been upgraded to 4k as of March 2022, restoring the music video and switching the Lover's Leap Remix audio back to the album version when the original music video used the album version.  In addition for the music video to be upgraded to 4k, the single was also reissued as an EP on 23 March 2022, which also includes the 'Reimagined' version from his compilation album The Best of Me.

Critical reception
British magazine Classic Pop ranked "Together Forever" number 20 in their list of "Top 40 Stock/Aitken/Waterman songs" in 2021. Colin Irwin from Number One wrote, "The song itself is another of those unforgettable little tunes which Mr Stock, Mr Aitken and Mr Waterman write in their sleep. [...] Ricks sings his darling little heart out and it all sounds brill to me."

Formats and track listings
 7" and mini CD single
 "Together Forever" (Lover's Leap Remix) – 3:20
 "I'll Never Set You Free" – 3:30

 12" maxi
 "Together Forever" (Lover's Leap Extended Remix) – 7:00
 "I'll Never Set You Free" – 3:30

 12" maxi – "Together Forever / Megamix"
 "Together Forever" (Super Dub Mix)
 "Don't Say Goodbye"
 "Never Gonna Give You Up"
 "Whenever You Need Somebody"
 "Together Forever" (with Gary Barlow)

 Together Forever - EP
 "Together Forever" (2022 - Remaster) – 3:25
 "Together Forever" (Reimagined) – 4:01
 "Together Forever" (Lover's Leap Remix) – 3:20
 "Together Forever" (House of Love Mix) – 6:56

Charts

Weekly charts

Year-end charts

Cover versions 
The song has been covered by artists such as José Galisteo, Jolina Magdangal, and Nina Nesbitt.

The Voice coaches Blake Shelton, John Legend, Kelly Clarkson and Nick Jonas covered the song to celebrate the show's 20th season, with Astley calling their version of the song "incredible."

The song was used as a demo on the Casio CA-100 electronic keyboard.

References

External links

1988 singles
Songs written by Mike Stock (musician)
Songs written by Matt Aitken
Songs written by Pete Waterman
Rick Astley songs
Billboard Hot 100 number-one singles
Cashbox number-one singles
Dance-pop songs
European Hot 100 Singles number-one singles
Irish Singles Chart number-one singles
Song recordings produced by Stock Aitken Waterman
RPM Top Singles number-one singles
1987 songs
RCA Records singles
Internet memes introduced in 2007